Systoechus is a genus of bee flies in the family Bombyliidae. There are more than 120 described species in Systoechus.

See also
 List of Systoechus species

References

Further reading

External links

 

Bombyliidae
Articles created by Qbugbot